Jean-Paul Jauffret (born August 22, 1930, in Bordeaux) is a French businessman, politician and tennis player.

Life and career 
Jauffret became a world veteran team champion on multiple occasions, along with the French cadet champion in 1946.

He was one of the key figures in the world of Bordeaux wine during the second half of the twentieth century. He ran the wine trading house CVBG-Dourthe-Kressmann and in 1981, he created the Vinexpo exhibition.

In 1995, he became Alain Juppé's finance assistant at the Bordeaux town hall and helped the city of Bordeaux improve its financial situation and reduce its debt. During the 2006 elections, he got a vote from the Socialist Party–Communist Party opposition. 

In 1998, Jauffret relaunched the wine festival,  that had been abandoned since 1909.

Recognition 

 President of the Conseil Interprofessionnel du Vin de Bordeaux (Bordeaux Wine Inter-professional Council)

 1981: Created the Vinexpo exhibition, a worldwide exhibition taking place every second year in the city of Bordeaux. 
 1981–1996: President of Vinexpo.

 1995–2007: President of the mixed economy company Gaz de Bordeaux (Bordeaux Gas).
 Member of the Bordeaux Wine Academy.

Sports 
 President of Guyenne's tennis league
 Member of the Federal Arbitration Commission of the French Tennis Federation

Electoral mandates 
 1995–2008: Deputy mayor of Bordeaux, in charge of public finance and budget.

See also 
 Vinexpo
 François Jauffret
 Conseil Interprofessionnel du Vin de Bordeaux

References

External links 
 

 French male tennis players
1930 births
Politicians from Bordeaux
 Chevaliers of the Légion d'honneur
Knights of the Ordre national du Mérite
 Oenologists
 Wine merchants
 French winemakers
 French chief executives
Living people
Businesspeople from Bordeaux